Marin Ivanović, better known by his pseudonym Stoka (the Croatian word for cattle), is a Croatian rap artist who used to be the half of the duo, Nered & Stoka. He stems from the Zagreb neighborhood of Kvatrić.

In 2005, Stoka was host of the Croatian version of The Bar reality show, which aired on Nova TV. In 2007, Stoka spent several months in a therapeutic community to fight his cocaine addiction.

References 

1981 births
Living people
Musicians from Zagreb
Croatian rappers